Guojia Tushuguan (National Library) Station is an interchange station on Line 4, Line 9 and Line 16 of the Beijing Subway. Its name is derived from the nearby National Library of China. The station features a double-island interchange layout, with Line 4 trains on the outside and Line 9 trains on the inside, which allows most riders to change lines simply by crossing the platform, instead of walking between levels. This configuration is known as cross-platform interchange. The station handles 106,000 transfers between Lines 4 and 9 per day.  The platform for Line 16 is built under the Line 4 and Line 9 platform. If the through service of Fangshan line to Line 9 is counted, which started on January 18, 2023, this would be the first four-line interchange on the Beijing Subway.

Station Layout 
The line 4 and 9 stations have underground dual-island platforms with cross-platform interchange. On one side, southbound line 4 trains to Tiangongyuan interchange with originating line 9 and weekday peak Fangshan line (through service) trains heading towards Guogongzhuang and Yancundong, whilst on the other, terminating line 9 and weekday peak Fangshan line (through service) trains interchange with northbound line 4 trains heading towards Anheqiao North. The line 16 station has a separate underground island platform.

Exits 
There are 6 exits, lettered A, B, C, D, E and F. Exits D and F are accessible via elevators.

Gallery

References

External links
 

Beijing Subway stations in Haidian District
Railway stations in China opened in 2009